In British rugby league, winning the treble refers to winning the Super League Grand Final, League Leaders' Shield, and Challenge Cup. Up until 1973 this was achieved by winning the Championship Final (the predecessors to the Super League Grand Final) as well as finishing top of the league during the regular season, in addition to winning the Challenge Cup. Between 1973 and 1996, following the abolition of the Grand Final, the league leaders were declared season champions. In this era, the Premiership was the third trophy required for the treble. Only six teams have completed the treble, and it has only been achieved three times during the Super League era. Wigan Warriors are the most successful team, winning the treble on 3 occasions.

Men's Treble

Bradford Bulls

2003
Bradford Bulls became the first team of the Super League era to win the treble in 2003. They beat Leeds Rhinos 22-20 in the 2003 Challenge Cup Final, won the League Leaders' Shield at the end of the season (the first time the current trophy was awarded) and completed the treble by beating Wigan Warriors 25-12 in the 2003 Super League Grand Final.

Huddersfield Giants

1912-13
Huddersfield Giants were the first team to complete the treble in the 1912-1913 season, beating Warrington Wolves 9-5 in the Challenge Cup final. They then went on to finish top of the league and win the Championship Final 29-2 beating Wigan.

1914-15
Huddersfield won their second treble before going on to win All Four Cups in 1914-15, beating St. Helens 37-3 in the Challenge Cup final and then beating Leeds 35-2 in the Championship Final a few weeks after they finished top of the league.

Leeds Rhinos

2015
Leeds won their only treble in 2015. They began by whitewashing Hull Kingston Rovers 50-0 in the biggest ever win in the Challenge Cup Final to claim back to back Cup wins for only the second time. They won the League Leader's Shield after beating Huddersfield Giants in the final match of Super League XX, with winger Ryan Hall scoring in the last second to win the match. They completed the treble after beating Wigan Warriors for the first time in a major final, winning 22-20 in the 2015 Super League Grand Final.

St Helens

1965-66
St Helens won their first treble in 1966, beating Wigan 21-2 in the Challenge Cup, finishing top of the league and beating Halifax 35-12 in the Championship Final.

2006
In 2006 Saints become only the second team in the Super League era to win the treble, 40 years after winning their first. They beat Huddersfield 42-12 in the 2006 Challenge Cup final, went on to finish top of Super League and beat Hull FC, who were playing in their first Grand Final, 26-4 in the 2006 Super League Grand Final. The 2006 St Helens team became only the second rugby league team in history to win the BBC Sports Personality Team of the Year Award.

Swinton Lions

1927-28
Swinton Lions won their only treble in 1927-28 before going on to win All Four Cups. They started by beating Warrington 5-3 in the Challenge Cup and beat Featherstone Rovers 11-0 in the Championship Final after they finished top of the league.

Wigan Warriors

1991-92
Wigan Warriors won their first treble in the 1991-92 season, finishing top of the league, defeating Castleford 28-12 in the Challenge Cup final and beating St Helens 48-16 in the Premiership final.

1993-94
Wigan won their second treble in 1993-94, finishing top of the league, defeating Leeds 26-12 in the Challenge Cup final and beating Castleford 24-20 in the Premiership final.

1994-95
Wigan won the treble for a record third time in the 1994-95 season, finishing top of the league, beating Leeds 30-10 in the Challenge Cup final and beating Leeds 69-12 in the Premiership final.

Winners by club

Women's Treble

Thatto Heath Crusaders / St Helens

Until 2021 Thatto Heath Crusaders were the only women's team to achieve the treble in British rugby league when they won all three trophies in 2016. The team then won again under the new St Helens name in 2021.

Bradford Bulls
Bradford Bulls became the second team to complete the women's treble a year later in 2017.

Winners by club

In France
Similar to the UK, the treble in French rugby league is achieved by winning the primary league competition, the Elite One Championship (French Rugby League Championship before 2002), the primary cup competition, the Lord Derby Cup, in addition to being the league leader at the end of the regular season. The teams that have achieved this are as follows:

NB: Treble information prior to 2002, the start of the Elite One Championship era, is unavailable.

Winners by club

Australia and the World Club Challenge

Due to the lack of a primary cup competition in the National Rugby League, Australian teams (and those from other countries associated with the league) are unable to win the treble, with the only major trophies traditionally available being that of the NRL Grand Final and Minor Premiership (equivalent of the League Leaders' Shield).

Since 1976, teams from both major leagues (the Super League and NRL) have had the ability to win the World Club Challenge, a one match competition played by the winners of both leagues. Since the switch to the summer era, the World Club Challenge victory needed to win the four trophies occurs the season following the league victory.

For a list of clubs to win this competition whist winning their respective Grand Final and League Leaders' Shield see here.
For a list of British clubs to win this competition whist also winning the treble see the list below:

NB: Whists this is a quadruple of trophies, it is not commonly referred to a "The Quadruple" in British rugby league.

Wigan Warriors

Wigan Warriors were the first to achieve a quadruple of trophies during the 1993-94 season. Following their treble victory they beat Brisbane Broncos 20–14 in the World Club Challenge.

Bradford Bulls

Bradford Bulls became the second team to do so, and the first of the Super League era, winning the treble in 2003 before completing the quadruple by beating Penrith Panthers 22–4 in the following year's World Club Challenge.

St Helens

St Helens became the most recent team win the quadruple. Following their treble victory in the 2006 season, they beat Brisbane Broncos 18–14 in the following year's World Club Challenge.

Winners by club

See also

The Double (rugby league)
All Four Cups

References

External links

Challenge Cup
Super League
Rugby Football League Championship
Rugby league trophies and awards
Rugby league competitions in the United Kingdom